Detective Inspector Jack Mooney is a fictional character on the British–French crime drama television series Death in Paradise, portrayed by Ardal O'Hanlon.

Character 
Mooney is portrayed as "friendly" and "unassuming", and an underestimated "genius detective". Ed Power for The Independent described the character of Mooney as a rarity amongst modern portrayals of detectives on television in that his "personal life is not a distracting mess".

Appearances 
Mooney first appears in Man Overboard – Part One (Series 6, Episode 5), as a liaison officer assigned to DI Humphrey Goodman when a case brings them to England to track a suspect. In the course of the case Mooney is revealed to be a recent widower; his wife died a month ago, but he pretends the death was some time ago to stop people feeling sorry for him. After the case is solved, Goodman decides to stay in England with his new girlfriend, and Mooney accepts the offer to use Goodman's shack on Saint Marie for a holiday. When he assists the team in investigating a couple of murders on the island during his time there, Mooney accepts the offer to stay and becomes the new DI of Saint Marie.

A subplot in the next season follows Mooney's daughter Siobhan leaving the island for university in the United Kingdom.

Another subplot follows Mooney's romance with Anna (portrayed by Nina Wadia), a newly divorced traveller visiting Saint Marie.

Mooney's last appearance is in Pirates of the Murder Scene (Series 9, Episode 4), when he decides to return home to London with his daughter Siobhan.

References 

Death in Paradise characters
Fictional British police detectives
Television characters introduced in 2017